Zalesie  is a settlement in the administrative district of Gmina Skulsk, within Konin County, Greater Poland Voivodeship, in west-central Poland.

References

Zalesie